Hallam is a surname. Notable people with the surname include:

Albert Hallam, English cricketer
Anthony Hallam (born 1933), British palaeontologist
Arthur Hallam, poet
Charles Hallam, English footballer
Chris Hallam (1962–2013), Welsh Paralympic athlete
Sir Clement Thornton Hallam, Solicitor to the General Post Office
Clint Hallam, the first hand transplant recipient
David Hallam, Member of the European Parliament
Elijah Hallam, miner
Graeme Hallam, English cricketer
Harry Hallam, English football manager
Henry Hallam, English actor
Henry Hallam, English historian
Ian Hallam, British cyclist
Jack Hallam, former Australian politician
Jack Hallam, professional footballer
Jennie Hallam-Peel, British debutante and chairwoman of the Queen Charlotte's Ball
John Hallam (disambiguation), several people
Jordan Hallam, English footballer
Lewis Hallam Jr, England-born American theatre manager
Maurice Hallam, English cricketer 
Norman Hallam, English footballer
Oscar Hallam, American lawyer, judge, and academic
Robert Hallam, bishop
Roger Hallam (disambiguation), list of people with the name
 Thomas Hallam (actor), British stage actor
Thomas Hallam, English cricketer
Tracey Hallam, badminton player
William and Lewis Hallam, who brought professional theatre to North America
William Hallam, Bishop
William Hallam, British trade unionist

Fictional characters
Aaron Hallam, a character in the 2003 movie The Hunted
Archie Hallam, a character in the British soap Doctors
Frederick Hallam, a character in the science fiction novel The Gods Themselves by Isaac Asimov

English-language surnames

fr:Hallam